Castellón Airport,  is an airport serving the city of Castellón de la Plana, located near Vilanova d'Alcolea, Benlloc and Cabanes in the Valencian Community, Spain.

History
The airport was officially declared "open" by local authorities in March 2011, shortly before regional elections and as total cost reached €150 million, despite having neither airlines signed up to land there nor government approval to operate. Delayed for several years, commercial flights were due to begin on 1 April 2012, but the first commercial flight to the airport landed on 15 September 2015.

In February 2012, it was reported that modifications would have to be made to the runway before the airport could be brought into use.  It was then later reported that the runway was to be dug up entirely.

The airport has become a symbol of the wasteful spending that has helped sink Spain deep into a recession and a banking crisis. For instance, the company in charge of running the airport, Aerocas, was found to have spent 26 million euros, a sixth of the cost of the airport, on sponsoring various sports teams in its region. Also, a $375,000, 24-metre-tall statue, often interpreted as a representation of Carlos Fabra, the formerly powerful local politician who was the driving force behind its construction, was erected just outside the airport. Fabra has been under judicial investigation in connection with several cases of corruption and tax evasion, and was sentenced to four years in prison for tax fraud in December 2014.

On 14 January 2014, nearly four years after the formal opening of the airport, a first flight departed from Castellón-Costa Azahar. Air Nostrum charter flight YW2003 carried the Villarreal CF football team, which is sponsored by the airport itself, to San Sebastián for their Copa del Rey match against Real Sociedad.

The first regular scheduled, albeit seasonal, flights from Castellón-Costa Azahar to Bristol and London Stansted, operated by Ryanair, began in September 2015. The European Union has opened a formal investigation into whether both the Canadian company that manages the airport (SNC-Lavalin) and Ryanair are receiving illegal subsidies from the regional government.

Between August and November 2020, three British Airways Boeing 747 aircraft that were retired were transported to Castellón-Costa Azahar Airport for dismantling. One aircraft, registration G-CIVD, caught fire and was severely damaged.

During the 2022 Russian invasion of Ukraine, Castellón-Costa Azahar Airport became a storage facility for Ukraine International Airlines fleet of six Boeing 737 aircraft.

In 2022, a number of airlines scheduled new routes from the airport.  These included Wizz Air to Budapest, Ryanair to Dublin and  Brussels South Charleroi and Air Nostrum connecting the airport domestically to Madrid.

Airlines and destinations
The following airlines operate regular scheduled and charter flights at Castellón–Costa Azahar Airport:

References

External links
 Official website

Airports in the Valencian Community
Transport companies of Spain
Airports established in 2011